The Battle of Inverlochy (1431) was fought after Alexander of Islay (Alasdair Ìle, Rìgh Innse Gall), Lord of the Isles and Earl of Ross, had been imprisoned by King James I. A force of Highlanders led by Donald Balloch, Alexander's cousin, defeated Royalist forces led by the Earls of Mar and Caithness at Inverlochy, near present-day Fort William. Over 1000 men were supposedly killed, among them the Earl of Caithness. Balloch then went on to ravage the country of Clan Cameron and Clan Chattan, who had been loyal to the king during the rebellion. King James himself soon after led an army into the Highlands, and the rebel forces disintegrated.

With the murder of King James 6 years later, Alexander was liberated, and renewed the campaign of vengeance against the Royalist supporters.

The pibroch The End of the Great Bridge is traditionally held to have been composed during the battle and Piobaireachd Domhnull Dubh, named for clan chief Donald Dubh Cameron, commemorates the battle.

See also 
 Battle of Lochaber (1429)
 Battle of Inverlochy (1645)

Notes and references 

 Bower, Walter, Scotichronicon, 1987–96.
 Brown, M., James I, 1994.
 MacDonald, Hugh, History of the MacDonalds, in Highland Papers, vol. I, 1914.

1431 in Scotland
15th-century Scottish clan battles
Battles involving Scotland
Conflicts in 1431
History of the Scottish Highlands
Lochaber